Janina Dawidowicz (born 19 March 1930 in Kalisz, Poland), better known as Janina David, is a Holocaust survivor and a British writer and translator.

Biography
Janina David was born as the only child to a Jewish Polish family, and moved with them to Warsaw in 1939. After she escaped from the Warsaw Ghetto in 1943, taking refuge with a Polish family of Henryk Rajski and then in a convent, and her parents had died as victims of the holocaust, she left Poland in 1946 and moved to Paris with an uncle. She then emigrated to Australia where she completed school and studied at the University of Melbourne, gaining a B.A. She then took Australian citizenship. In 1958, she moved to London, where she was a social worker in some hospitals. In 1959 she began to write her three-volume autobiography, A Square of Sky, A Touch of Earth and Light over the Water. Since 1978, she has been working as an author and translator of children's and young people's books, and of radio plays, for the BBC and others.

Books
 1964 A Square of Sky: A Jewish Childhood in Wartime Poland 
 1966 A Touch of Earth: A Wartime Childhood
 1995 Light Over the Water: Post-war Wanderings 1946-48 
 1969 Part of the Main 
 1992 A Square of Sky: A Wartime Childhood from Ghetto to Convent (a republication of A Square of Sky and A Touch of Earth in a single volume)

Film
Franz Peter Wirth filmed Leo Lehmann's adaptation of the book A Square of Sky as the 1982 mini-series Ein Stück Himmel for the ARD and the leading actress Dana Vávrová became popular in Germany in the role of Janina David.

Theatre
Janina David's autobiography A Square of Sky was the basis for a theatre show with the same title.

Honours
1982 - Goldener Gong for Ein Stück Himmel, together with Dana Vávrová and Franz Peter Wirth

References

External links
 
 

1930 births
Living people
People from Kalisz
Warsaw Ghetto inmates
University of Melbourne alumni
Polish emigrants to the United Kingdom
English Jews
English women non-fiction writers
English autobiographers
British Jewish writers
Women autobiographers